The Childers Farmstead is a historic farm property in rural southern White County, Arkansas.  It is located south of McRae, near the junction of Bowman and Rip Kirk Roads.  The farmstead includes three buildings: the main house, a large barn, and a small "Delco house", originally built to house electricity generation equipment provided by Delco Electronics.  The main house is a vernacular single story wood-frame structure, with a hip roof and a shed-roof porch extending across its main (northern) facade.  That facade is symmetrically arranged, with Craftsman-style windows on either side of the entrance, which is flanked by half-length sidelights.  The house was built about 1925, and is an unusual example of a retro version of Greek Revival architecture with Craftsman features. It was torn down in 2020.

The property was listed on the National Register of Historic Places in 1992.

See also
National Register of Historic Places listings in White County, Arkansas

References

Houses on the National Register of Historic Places in Arkansas
Greek Revival houses in Arkansas
Houses completed in 1925
Houses in White County, Arkansas
National Register of Historic Places in White County, Arkansas
Demolished buildings and structures in Arkansas
Buildings and structures demolished in 2020
American Craftsman architecture in Arkansas
Energy infrastructure in Arkansas